Trichocoma is a genus of fungi in the family Trichocomaceae. The type species, Trichocoma paradoxa, is widespread in tropical regions. Commonly known as the "shaving brush fungus", it is about 2 cm tall, 0.5 cm wide, and not edible. Mostly found during the winter season, it is spore bearing.

References

Trichocomaceae
Eurotiomycetes genera
Taxa described in 1893
Taxa named by Franz Wilhelm Junghuhn